Roy Hardee "Red" Massey (October 9, 1890 – June 23, 1954) was a Major League Baseball player. He played one season with the Boston Braves in 1918.

References

External links

Boston Braves players
Major League Baseball outfielders
Baseball players from Tennessee
Savannah Indians players
Galveston Pirates players
Chattanooga Lookouts players
Minneapolis Millers (baseball) players
Columbus Senators players
Louisville Colonels (minor league) players
1890 births
1954 deaths
People from Sevierville, Tennessee